Maja Miletić (born 10 June 2002) is a Montenegrin footballer who plays as a defender for Women's League club ŽFK Breznica and the Montenegro women's national team.

Club career
Miletić has played for Breznica in Montenegro.

International career
Miletić made her senior debut for Montenegro on 21 February 2021.

References

2002 births
Living people
Montenegrin women's footballers
Women's association football defenders
ŽFK Breznica players
Montenegro women's international footballers